Dragon C208 is the first Cargo Dragon 2 spacecraft, and the first in a line of International Space Station resupply craft which replaced the Dragon capsule, manufactured by SpaceX. The mission is contracted by NASA under the Commercial Resupply Services (CRS) program. It flew for the first time on the CRS-21 mission on 6 December 2020. This was the first flight for SpaceX under NASA's CRS Phase 2 contract awarded in January 2016. This was also the first time a Cargo Dragon was docked at the same time as a Crew Dragon spacecraft (SpaceX Crew-1). This mission used Booster B1058.4.

Cargo Dragon
C208 is the first SpaceX Dragon 2 cargo variant. C208 and the other Cargo Dragons are different from the crewed variant by launching without seats, cockpit controls, astronaut life support systems, or SuperDraco abort engines.  The Cargo Dragon improves on many aspects of the original Dragon design, including the recovery and refurbishment process.

The new Cargo Dragon capsules splashes down under parachutes in the Atlantic Ocean east of Florida or in the Gulf of Mexico, rather than the previous recovery zone in the Pacific Ocean west of Baja California. This NASA preference was added to all CRS-2 awards to allow for cargo to be more quickly returned to the Kennedy Space Center after splashdown.

Flights

See also 

 SpaceX Crew-1
 Boeing CST-100 Starliner
 Crew Dragon C201
 Cargo Dragon C209
 Cargo Dragon C211

References

SpaceX Dragon 2
Individual space vehicles
NASA spacecraft
Uncrewed spacecraft
Cargo spacecraft